Henry Somerset, 2nd Duke of Beaufort, KG PC (2 April 1684 – 24 May 1714) was an English peer and politician. He was the only son of Charles Somerset, Marquess of Worcester, and Rebecca Child. He was styled Earl of Glamorgan until 1698, and Marquess of Worcester from 1698 until his grandfather's death on 21 January 1700, when he succeeded him as 2nd Duke of Beaufort.

Life
Born at Monmouth Castle, he entertained Queen Anne and the Prince Consort with splendour at Badminton in August 1702. He held aloof from public affairs until the fall of Sunderland heralded the collapse of the Whig Junto in 1710, when he is said to have remarked to the queen that he could at length call her a queen in reality. A thorough-going Tory, he was, after some opposition from Jonathan Swift, admitted a member of the "Brothers’ Club" on 21 February 1711. He was made captain of the gentlemen pensioners in 1712, and appointed a Knight of the Garter in October 1712.

Dying at the age of thirty, on 24 May 1714, Beaufort was succeeded by his son Henry. The 2nd Duke is buried at St Michael and All Angels Church, Badminton.

Family
He married three times: 
 On 7 July 1702 to Lady Mary Sackville, daughter of Charles Sackville, 6th Earl of Dorset, who died 18 June 1705, with whom he had no issue;
 On 26 February 1706 to Lady Rachel Noel, daughter of Wriothesley Baptist Noel, 2nd Earl of Gainsborough, who died 13 September 1709 after giving birth, and
 On 14 September 1711 at St Mary's Church, Wimbledon to Lady Mary Osborne (d. 4 February 1722), daughter of Peregrine Osborne, 2nd Duke of Leeds, with whom he had no issue.

With his second wife he had two sons:
 Henry Somerset, 3rd Duke of Beaufort his heir and successor; and
 Charles Noel Somerset, 4th Duke of Beaufort his brother's heir and successor.

Notes

Attribution

1684 births
1714 deaths
102
10
Garter Knights appointed by Anne
Lord-Lieutenants of Gloucestershire
Lord-Lieutenants of Hampshire
Masters of foxhounds in England
Members of the Privy Council of Great Britain
Henry Somerset, 02nd Duke of Beaufort
Honourable Corps of Gentlemen at Arms